People's Romeo is a play by British playwright Mukul Ahmed based on William Shakespeare's Romeo and Juliet.

Cast
Delwar Hossain Dilu as Romeo / Narrator
Caitlin Thorburn as Juliet / Friar Laurence / Tybalt
Leesa Gazi as Juliet's Nurse / Lady Montague
Swagata Biswas as percussionist
Sohini Alam as singer

Themes
Performed in both English and Bengali it blends William Shakespeare's words with Bengali poetry and the Pala Gaan theatrical tradition of song, music, dance and story-telling is used. The original text, alongside modern English, is also used.

Production
The People's Romeo was developed across a two-year period by Wandsworth-based theatre company Tara Arts. The production's name – People's Romeo – reflects the sub-continent's traditions of People's Theatre, where performers tour with a minimum of props and a small cast.

The cast of three actors; Delwar Hossain Dilu, Caitlin Thorburn and Leesa Gazi play multiple roles, transitioning from one character, although the story has been pared down. Characters such as Mercutio and Count Paris have been left out all together. Several important parts have been left out, notably, the reason for Romeo not knowing that Juliet has faked her death was omitted. The company of five also includes singer Sohini Alam joining in traditional and modern Bengali folk songs, and percussionist Swagata Biswas provides us with a live musical score. The set was designed by Sophie Jump's and the lighting designed by Howard Hudson.

Tour
The People's Romeo opened at Greenwich Theatre in September 2010, as part of a UK tour. Prior to a UK tour, it played five performances at TARA Studio ahead of visits to Greenwich, Plymouth, Wolverhampton, Crawley , London's Asia House and Waterman's Hull, Darlington and Birmingham. The show was also staged at Hull Truck Theatre as part of Black History Month.

Reception
Deborah Klayman of The Public Reviews rated People's Romeo it 3/5 called it "is energetic and entertaining with moments that are exciting, moving, and humorous." Matthew Jenkins of News Hopper said, "Both charming and moving, People's Romeo is a brave attempt to try something genuinely new and makes for a culturally enriching and entertaining two hours."

The Stage said, "Director Mukul Ahmed may have taken several liberties with Shakespeare's original but the important elements remain and his cast of five performers, including a percussionist and vocalist create an utterly absorbing piece of theatre. OffWestEnd.com said, "The People's Romeo is a dynamic cross-cultural performance made for our time that uses Pala Gaan, a popular Bengali folk theatre style that combines music, dance and storytelling to re-invent this classic of English theatre.

See also
 Nemesis by Natyaguru Nurul Momen
 Nondito Noroke by Humayun Ahmed
 NityaPurana by Masum Reza
 Che'r Cycle by Mamunur Rashid
 British Bangladeshi

References

2010 plays
British plays
English-language plays
Bengali-language plays
Plays and musicals based on Romeo and Juliet
Plays by Mukul Ahmed
Bangladeshi drama
Theatre in Bangladesh
Bangladeshi plays